Miroslav Gajdůšek (born 20 September 1951) is a former Czech footballer.

During his career, he played for TJ Gottwaldov, Dukla Prague and TJ Vítkovice. He played total 355 league matches and scored 77 goals. He won the Czechoslovak First League with Dukla in 1977 and 1979.

Gajdůšek earned 48 caps and scored 4 goals for the Czechoslovakia national football team from 1971 to 1980, and participated in UEFA Euro 1980.

External links
 
 Hall of Fame Dukla Praha profile

1951 births
Living people
Czech footballers
Czechoslovak footballers
Czechoslovakia international footballers
UEFA Euro 1980 players
FC Fastav Zlín players
Dukla Prague footballers
MFK Vítkovice players
Association football forwards
People from Zlín District
Sportspeople from the Zlín Region